Fred James Hoey (May 12, 1884 – November 17, 1949) was an American radio sports announcer of Major League Baseball. Hoey called games for the Boston Braves during 1925–1938 and Boston Red Sox during 1927–1938.

Biography

Hoey was born in Boston and raised in Saxonville, Massachusetts. At the age of 12, Hoey saw his first baseball game during the 1897 Temple Cup. Hoey would later play semi-professional baseball and work as an usher at the Huntington Avenue Grounds.

In 1903, Hoey was hired as a sportswriter, writing about high school sports, baseball, and hockey. In 1924, he became the first publicity director of the Boston Bruins. Hoey began broadcasting Boston Braves games in 1925 and Boston Red Sox games in 1927, becoming the first full-time announcer for both teams.

In 1933, Hoey was hired by CBS Radio to call Games 1 and 5 of the World Series after commissioner Kenesaw Mountain Landis declared that Ted Husing and Graham McNamee could not call World Series games because they did not call any regular season games. Hoey was removed from the CBS broadcasting booth during the fourth inning of Game 1 after his voice went out. Although reported as a cold, Hoey's garbled and incoherent words led many to think that Hoey was drunk. After this incident, Hoey never went to the broadcast booth without a tin of throat lozenges. His only other national assignment was calling the 1936 Major League Baseball All-Star Game, played in Boston, for Mutual.

After the 1936 season, Hoey was fired by the head of the Yankee Network, John Shepard III. Baseball fans, including Franklin D. Roosevelt, rallied to his defense. After the 1938 season, Hoey demanded a raise, but the sponsors, despite public pressure, replaced Hoey with former player and manager Frankie Frisch. After leaving the booth, Hoey covered the Red Sox and Braves in Boston newspapers until 1946.

Hoey died in his home in Winthrop, Massachusetts, of accidental gas asphyxiation on November 17, 1949.

References

Further reading

External links 
1936 All Star Game Complete Radio Broadcast (Linus Travers and Fred Hoey) via YouTube

1884 births
1949 deaths
Sportspeople from Boston
Sportspeople from Framingham, Massachusetts
American sports announcers
Baseball people from Massachusetts
Boston Braves announcers
Boston Red Sox announcers
Major League Baseball broadcasters
Accidental deaths in Massachusetts
Deaths from asphyxiation